The following is a list of basilicas in New Zealand. This list is by architectural style of building rather than by any special criteria granted by the Pope. New Zealand has no minor basilicas declared by the Vatican.

List by date of completion

References

Basilica churches in New Zealand
Roman Catholic churches in New Zealand
New Zealand
Lists of churches in New Zealand